A chlorine fluoride is an interhalogen compound containing only chlorine and fluorine.

External links 
 National Pollutant Inventory - Fluoride compounds fact sheet
 NIST Standard Reference Database
 WebElements

Inorganic chlorine compounds
Fluorides
Interhalogen compounds